Karl Hein (11 June 1908 – 10 July 1982) was a German hammer thrower who won a gold medal at the 1936 Summer Olympics held in Berlin.

By the early 1930s Hein had married and retired from athletics. He resumed competing after watching a film about the 1932 Olympics, and remained active until the late 1950s, winning the national championships in 1936–38 and 1946–47 and placing second in 1956. In 1938 he set two world records and won the European title. In 1962 he was awarded the Rudolf-Harbig-Gedächtnispreis.

Hein died from a stroke aged 74. His son Karl-Peter also competed in the hammer throw, at national level.

References

1908 births
1982 deaths
German male hammer throwers
Olympic gold medalists for Germany
Athletes (track and field) at the 1936 Summer Olympics
Olympic athletes of Germany
Athletes from Hamburg
European Athletics Championships medalists
Medalists at the 1936 Summer Olympics
Olympic gold medalists in athletics (track and field)